A terminal pager, paging program or simply pager is a computer program used to view (but not modify) the contents of a text file moving down the file one line or one screen at a time.  Some, but not all, pagers allow movement up a file.  A popular cross-platform terminal pager is more, which can move forwards and backwards in text files but cannot move backwards in pipes. less is a more advanced pager that allows movement forward and backward, and contains extra functions such as search.

Some programs incorporate their own paging function, for example bash's tab completion function.

Examples
 more
 less
 pg
 most
 nano --view
 emacs -nw -e "(view-mode)"
 w3m

References